John Alden Woodcock Jr. (born July 6, 1950) is a senior United States district judge of the United States District Court for the District of Maine.

Education and career

Born in Bangor, Maine, Woodcock received a Bachelor of Arts degree from Bowdoin College in 1972, a Master of Arts degree from London School of Economics in 1973, and a Juris Doctor from the University of Maine School of Law in 1976. He was in private practice in Maine from 1976 to 2003. He was an assistant district attorney (part-time) in the State of Maine from 1977 to 1978.

District court service

On March 27, 2003, Woodcock was nominated by President George W. Bush to a seat on the United States District Court for the District of Maine vacated by Gene Carter. Woodcock was confirmed by the United States Senate on June 12, 2003, and received his commission on June 16, 2003. He served as Chief Judge from 2009, to January 5, 2015. He assumed senior status as June 27, 2017.

References

 

1950 births
Living people
Alumni of the London School of Economics
Bowdoin College alumni
Judges of the United States District Court for the District of Maine
People from Bangor, Maine
United States district court judges appointed by George W. Bush
University of Maine School of Law alumni
21st-century American judges